Penny Hubbard (born October 26, 1953) is an American politician. She is a former Democratic member of the Missouri House of Representatives, representing District 78 from 2011 to 2017. She is a member of the Democratic party.

References

1953 births
Living people
Politicians from Kansas City, Missouri
Women state legislators in Missouri
Democratic Party members of the Missouri House of Representatives
21st-century American politicians
21st-century American women politicians